Enrique Pintado (Montevideo, 1958) is a Uruguayan politician.

A member of the Broad Front (Uruguay Assembly), since 1 March 2010 he is the Minister of Transport and Public Works in the cabinet of President José Mujica.

References

External links
 MTOP 

1958 births
People from Montevideo
Presidents of the Chamber of Representatives of Uruguay
Uruguayan politicians
Uruguay Assembly politicians
Ministers of Transport and Public Works of Uruguay
Living people